Word of Faith is a movement within charismatic Christianity which teaches that Christians can get power and financial prosperity through prayer, and that those who believe in Jesus' death and resurrection have the right to physical health. The movement was founded by the American Kenneth Hagin in the 1960s, and has its roots in the teachings of E. W. Kenyon.

History
The Baptist minister E.W. Kenyon (1867–1948) is generally cited as the originator of Word of Faith's teachings. Kenyon's writings influenced Kenneth Hagin Sr., the recognized "father" of the Word of Faith movement. Hagin, who had founded a ministry known as the Kenneth E Hagin Evangelistic Association, started disseminating his views in the Word of Faith magazine in 1966, and subsequently founded a seminary training Word of Faith ministers.

Teachings
Distinctive Word of Faith teachings include physical, emotional, financial, relational, and spiritual healing for those who keep their covenant with God. The movement urges believers to speak what they desire, in agreement with the promises and provisions of the Bible, as an affirmation of God's plans and purposes. They believe this is what Jesus meant when he said in  that believers shall have whatsoever they say and pray with faith.

Healing
The Word of Faith teaches that complete healing (of spirit, soul, and body) is included in Christ's atonement and therefore is available here and now to all who believe.

Because Isaiah speaks in the present tense ("we are healed"), Word of Faith teaches that believers should accept the reality of a healing that is already theirs, first by understanding that physical healing is part of the New Testament's promise of salvation. It is reinforced by confessing the Bible verses which assert this healing and believing them while rejecting doubt. This does not deny pain, sickness, or disease, but denies its right to supersede the gift of salvation in Isaiah 53:5 and many other passages. According to adherents, sickness is generally Satan's attempt to rob believers of their divine right to total health.

Prosperity

Word of Faith teaching holds that its believers have a divine right to prosper in all areas of life, including finances, health, marriage, and relationships.

Word of Faith preachers such as Creflo Dollar and Kenneth Copeland claim that Jesus was rich, and teach that modern believers are entitled to financial wealth.

Faith and confession
In Word of Faith teaching, a central element of receiving from God is "confession", often called "positive confession" or "faith confession" by practitioners. Practitioners will claim and affirm they have healing, well being, prosperity, or other promises from God, before actually experiencing such results. They do so in demonstration of their faith, which they believe will ultimately result in the fulfillment of their words. While similar, it should not be confused with Norman Vincent Peale's positive thinking theology focusing on the individual, as evidenced by the motto, "Faith in God and believe in oneself". Noted Word of Faith teachers, such as Kenneth E. Hagin and Charles Capps, have argued that God created the universe by speaking it into existence, and that God has endowed believers with this power. Thus, making a "positive confession" of God's promise and believing God's word stirs the power of resurrection which raised Christ from the dead, and brings that promise to fulfilment. A more recent variant of positive confession is "decree and declare". Word of Faith preachers have called faith a "force".

Conversely, "negative confession" can harm, so believers should be conscious of their words.

Criticism
Many of the movement's essential beliefs are criticised by other Christians. Christian author Robert M. Bowman, Jr. states that the word of faith movement is "neither soundly orthodox nor thoroughly heretical".

One of the earliest critics of Word of Faith teaching was Oral Roberts University professor Charles Farah, who published From the Pinnacle of the Temple in 1979. In the book, Farah expressed his disillusionment with the teachings, which he argued were more about presumption than faith.

In 1982, one of Farah's students, Daniel Ray McConnell, submitted a thesis, Kenyon Connection, to the faculty at Oral Roberts University, tracing the teaching back through Hagin to Kenyon and ultimately to New Thought, and calling the distinctive Word of Faith beliefs a heretical "Trojan Horse" in the Christian church.  McConnell's repeated this argument in his book, A Different Gospel, in 1988.

One of McConnell's classmates, Dale H. Simmons, published his own doctoral research at Drew University, arguing that Kenyon was influenced by heterodox metaphysical movements and the Faith Cure movement of the nineteenth century. In 1990, The Agony of Deceit surveyed the critiques of Word of Faith doctrines. One of the authors, Christian Research Institute founder Walter Martin, issued his personal judgment that Kenneth Copeland was a false prophet and that the movement as a whole was heretical.

Milder criticisms were made by William DeArteaga in his book Quenching the Spirit. He concedes some New Thought influence in Kenyon's teaching, but argues that Kenyon's views helped the church rediscover some biblical truths. Arguing similarly but in an opposite direction is Robert M. Bowman, Jr., formerly of the Christian Research Institute. His book The Word-Faith Controversy is more sympathetic to Kenyon's historical background yet more critical of his doctrine than is DeArteaga's work.

Baptist evangelist Justin Peters, an outspoken critic of the Word of Faith movement, wrote his Master of Divinity thesis on Benny Hinn and has appeared frequently as an expert on Word of Faith pastors in documentaries and TV news stories. In his seminar "A Call for Discernment", he traces the movement's origins to the Phineas Quimby's New Thought Movement and Mary Baker Eddy's Christian Science in the late 19th and early 20th centuries.

In contrast, Pastor Joe McIntyre, now head of Kenyon's Gospel Publishing Society in Washington, argues that the primary influences of Kenyon were A.B. Simpson and A.J. Gordon of the Faith Cure branch of the Evangelical movement. McIntyre's version is told in the authorized biography, E.W. Kenyon: The True Story.

That same year, Pentecostal scholar Gordon Fee wrote a series of articles denouncing what he called The Disease of the Health-and-Wealth Gospel.

In 1993, Hank Hanegraaff's Christianity in Crisis charged the Word of Faith movement with heresy and accused many of its churches of being "cults." He accused the Word of Faith teachers of "demoting" God and Jesus, and "deifying" man and Satan. Hanegraaff has focused a significant portion of his anti-heresy teaching since the 1990s on addressing and refuting Word of Faith teachings.

Other critics, such as Norman Geisler, Dave Hunt and Roger Oakland, have denounced Word of Faith theology as aberrant and contrary to the teachings of the Bible. Critics have also condemned the teachings on wealth, arguing that the Bible condemns the pursuit of riches.

John Piper points out that Christ warned the apostles that they would suffer great persecution for his sake: except John, all eleven, after Judas Iscariot, suffered martyrs' deaths. In a January 2006 sermon entitled "How our Suffering Advances the Gospel," Piper stated bluntly that "the prosperity gospel will not make anybody praise Jesus; it will make people praise prosperity."

'Little gods' belief
Many Word of Faith teachers use phrases such as "little gods" to describe believers. Kenneth Hagin wrote that God had created humans "in the same class of being that he is himself," and reasoned that if humans are made in God's image, they are "in God’s class", and thereby ‘gods’. 

Many Evangelical critics have condemned the "little gods" teaching as cultic. Hank Hanegraaff, for example, contends the 'little gods' doctrine is on a par with the teaching of the Maharishi Mahesh Yogi and Jim Jones.

See also
 Full Gospel
 Chris Oyakhilome
 Abundant life
 Margaret Court
 Sam P. Chelladurai
 Word of Faith Ministries
 Word of Faith Fellowship

Bible passages

 Romans 12:2
 Matthew 11:25-30
 Galatians 5:1
 Mark 11:12-25
 Colossians 2
 Hebrews 6:1-2
 1 Corinthians 3
 Galatians 3
 Romans 7:1-6
 Matthew 18:1-6
 1 Corinthians 2:6-16
 Matthew 17:14-20
 Matthew 20:1-16
 Matthew 8:5-18
 Matthew 25:14-30
 Luke 19:11-27
 1 Corinthians 13
 Matthew 22:36-40
 John 21:15-19
 Matthew 16:13-20
 Matthew 6:5-14
 Matthew 7:15-23
 1 John 4:6
 2 Peter 2
 Jude
 1 Corinthians 5
 Hebrews 11-13

Notes and references

External links
Kenyon's Gospel Publishing Society
Kenneth Hagin Ministries

Christian personal development
Christian theological movements
Christian terminology
Heresy in Christianity
Pentecostalism